Atlanta's Third Ward was defined in 1880 as the area bounded on the North by Georgia Railroad, West by Butler & McDonough Streets, South and East by the city limits (the green section of picture)

Generally in Atlanta's Ward System, it encompassed the following modern neighborhoods: Grant Park, Ormewood Park and Cabbagetown.

1854

The original boundaries for five wards were laid out in an unknown fashion and two councilmen from each ward were elected to coincide with the completion of the first official city hall in 1854.

Third Ward councilmen of this period were
1855 John Farrar and J. W. Thompson
1856 Thomas L. Thomas and James L. Terry
1857 John B. Peck and John Glen
1858 James E. Williams and J.M. Blackwell
1859 Coleman F. Wood and J.M. Blackwell
1860 James R.D. Ozburn and Merrill T. Castelberry
1861 Seymour B. Love and Robert Crawford
1862 John Farrar and James G. Kelly
1863 F.D. Thurman and James G. Kelly
1864 William Watkins and Robert Crawford
1865 Thomas R. Ripley and F.M. Richardson
1866 Robert Crawford and James G. Kelly
1867 W.C. Anderson and George W. Terry
1868 (no election)
1869 Vardy P Sisson and William C. Anderson
1870 James G. Kelly and W.C. Anderson

1871

1871 George Graham
1872 Lemuel P. Grant and Thomas A. Morris
1873 Robert C. Young and David A. Beatie
1874 James G. Kelly and Robert C. Young
1875 Thomas A. Morris and David A. Beatie

1876

The new city charter reduced the number of wards to 5 and created a Board of Aldermen
1876 William Gray
1877 J.M. Buice
1878 William E. Hayne
1879 James K. Thrower
1880 Thomas J. Buchanan
1881 David A. Beatie
1882 Zachry W. Adamson
1883 Samuel W. Day

1884
Sixth Ward (north Peachtree corridor) added

1884 C. Wheeler Mangum
1885 David A. Beatie
1886 Edgar A. Angier
1887 Elisha T. Allen
1888 James G. Woodward
1889 James G. Woodward and A.S. Robbins
1890 A.S. Robbins and W.H. Hulsey
1891 W.H. Hulsey and Arnold Broyles
1892 John F. McWaters
1893 David A. Beatie

1894
Seventh Ward (West End) added
1894 Robert P. Dodge
1895 Walter S. Bell
1896 William E. Adamson
1897 Eldred S. Lumpkin
1898 Edward P. Burns
1899 J. Sidney Holland, manager Kimball House Saloon
1900 Axton C. Minhinnett, grocer
1901 John C. Reed, lawyer
1902 James E. Warren, lawyer
1903 J. Sid Holland, tobacconist
1904 Thomas H. Goodwin, lawyer

1905
Eighth Ward (West End) added
1905 William Oldknow, poolroom proprietor

History of Atlanta